Glyphoglossus volzi, also known as Sumatra squat frog, is a species of frog in the family Microhylidae. It is endemic to Sumatra, Indonesia. The specific name volzi honours Dr Walter Volz, a Swiss zoologist and traveller.

It is only known from few specimens, but this likely reflects the lack of suitable sampling methods for what is likely a fossorial species. It probably lays its eggs in pools of standing water on the forest floor. The main threat to this species is clear-cutting of lowland tropical rainforest for oil palm plantations, small-holder agriculture, and wood extraction. It is present in the Bukit Barisan Selatan National Park and may be present in other protected areas.

References

volzi
Amphibians of Indonesia
Endemic fauna of Sumatra
Taxa named by Pieter Nicolaas van Kampen
Amphibians described in 1905
Taxonomy articles created by Polbot